Ye Zaw Htet Aung (born 1 April 1991) is a footballer from Burma, and a defender for Myanmar national football team and Myanmar U-22 football team. He is two-time Myanmar National League winner with Yadanarbon.

References

1991 births
Living people
Burmese footballers
Myanmar international footballers
Association football forwards